Akbarpur Junction railway station is a junction station between Lucknow, Faizabad Junction railway station (Ayodhya Cantt), and Varanasi. It serves Akbarpur city. Railway stations near Akbarpur are Shahganj Junction (SHG), Jaunpur Junction (JNU), Goshainganj (GGJ), Malipur (MLPR) and Bilwai (BWI). This station is under  Redevelopment.
Station consist of double line electrified track. 

Akbarpur junction to Goshaiganj railway station doubling and electrification completed on 25 July 2022.

Jaunpur to Tanda NTPC doubling and electrification is scheduled to be completed by December 2022.

A passenger train from Tanda to varanasi junction via akbarpur junction is scheduled to be operational after doubling and electrification will complete.

Tanda track
A single track line from NTPC Tanda via Tanda City joins the main line at Akbarpur railway station.  The Tanda track is exclusively operated by goods trains that supply coal and other goods to Tanda City and Tanda Thermal Power Plant. A service for passenger trains from Akbarpur Junction to Tanda City is under consideration.

See also
 Goshainganj railway station
 Ayodhya Junction
 Lucknow Charbagh railway station
 Varanasi Junction railway station
 Jaunpur Junction

References

Railway junction stations in Uttar Pradesh
Railway stations in Ambedkar Nagar district
Lucknow NR railway division
Railway stations opened in 1873
Akbarpur, Ambedkar Nagar